"Enkyō" may refer to:

Japanese era names

, 1308–1311–an era in the Kamakura period, also known as "Engyō" and "Enkei"
, 1744–1748–an era in the Edo period

People

 Kabukidō Enkyō, a 17th-century Japanese artist
 Enkyo Pat O'Hara, an American Soto priest and teacher in the Harada-Yasutani lineage of Zen Buddhism